Karol Stanisław Olszewski (29 January 1846 – 24 March 1915) was a Polish chemist, mathematician and physicist.

Biography
Olszewski was a graduate of Kazimierz Brodziński High School in Tarnów (I Liceum Ogólnokształcące im. Kazimierza Brodzińskiego). He studied at Kraków's Jagiellonian University in the departments of mathematics and physics, and chemistry and biology. He carried out his first experiments using a personally improved compressor, compressing and condensing carbon dioxide.

Olszewski defended his doctoral dissertation at Heidelberg University, then returned to Kraków, where he was made profesor nadzwyczajny (associate professor).

In 1883, Zygmunt Wróblewski and Karol Olszewski were the first in the world to liquefy oxygen, nitrogen and carbon dioxide from the atmosphere in a stable state (not, as had been the case up to then, in a dynamic state in the transitional form as vapor).

In 1884, in his Kraków laboratory, Olszewski was the first to liquefy hydrogen in a dynamic state, achieving a record low temperature of −225 °C (48 K). In 1895 he liquefied argon.  He then failed only to liquefy the newly discovered helium element.

In January 1896, on hearing of Wilhelm Röntgen's work with X-rays, within a few days Olszewski replicated it. Later on, in early February he provided an X-ray image of a luxated elbow thus initiating the university's department of radiology.

He died on 24 March 1915 and was buried at the Rakowicki Cemetery in Kraków. In 2018, his ashes were transferred to one of Poland's National Pantheons located at the Church of Saints Peter and Paul in the Old Town district of Kraków.

See also
Timeline of low-temperature technology
Timeline of hydrogen technologies
List of Poles

Notes

References

 "Olszewski, Karol Stanisław," Encyklopedia Polski, p. 464.

1846 births
1915 deaths
People from Ropczyce-Sędziszów County
19th-century Polish chemists
19th-century Polish physicists
Jagiellonian University alumni
Heidelberg University alumni